Gravel Hill or Gravelhill is an unincorporated community located within Monroe Township in Middlesex County, New Jersey, United States. Located in a rural part of Monroe Township, the area is made up of approximately half farmland and half forestland. Homes line the roads that run through the area.

References

Monroe Township, Middlesex County, New Jersey
Unincorporated communities in Middlesex County, New Jersey
Unincorporated communities in New Jersey